Nova Institution for Women is a Canadian federal prison for women in Truro, Nova Scotia. The facility, which handles different levels of offenders, can accommodate up to 70 inmates. Nova Institution opened in 1995.
 The maximum security unit opened in 2002 or 2003.

Main programs at the institution include:

 Living skills
 Sex offender programs
 Substance abuse treatment

The Correctional Service of Canada (CSC) is the federal government agency responsible for administering sentences of a term of two years or more.

Ashley Smith
Ashley Smith, a prisoner who later died after an apparent suicide attempt, was held at several CSC institutions including Nova Institution.

References

External links
Correctional Service of Canada Official Site: csc-scc.gc.ca

Buildings and structures in Colchester County
Correctional Service of Canada institutions
Prisons in Nova Scotia
Truro, Nova Scotia
Women's prisons in Canada
Women in Nova Scotia
1995 establishments in Nova Scotia